Lenvik is a former municipality that was located in the old Troms county, Norway. The municipality existed from 1838 until its dissolution in 2020. The municipality was partly situated on the mainland and partly on the island of Senja in what is now Senja Municipality in Troms og Finnmark county. The administrative centre was the town of Finnsnes, where the Gisund Bridge connects Senja to the mainland on Norwegian County Road 86.  Other villages in the municipality included Aglapsvik, Gibostad, Botnhamn, Fjordgård, Finnfjordbotn, Husøy, Langnes, Laukhella, Silsand, and Rossfjordstraumen.  The lake Lysvatnet was located in the municipality on Senja island, west of Gibostad.

At the time of its dissolution as a municipality on 1 January 2020, the  municipality was the 126th largest by area out of the 422 municipalities in Norway. Lenvik was also the 101st most populous municipality in Norway with a population of 11,644.

General information

The large municipality of Lenvik was established on 1 January 1838 (see formannskapsdistrikt).  In 1848, most of the mainland parts of Lenvik (population: 2,616) was separated to form the new Målselv Municipality, leaving Lenvik with 3,029 residents.  Then in 1855, the northern part of Lenvik (population: 811) was separated to form the new municipality of Hillesøy.  This left Lenvik with 2,757 inhabitants.  On 1 January 1871, a small part of Lenvik (population: 70) was transferred to the neighboring municipality of Malangen.

During the 1960s, there were many municipal mergers across Norway due to the work of the Schei Committee. On 1 January 1964, many several neighboring areas were merged into Lenvik:
the part of Sørreisa Municipality on the island of Senja (population: 129)
the Hellemo, Paulsrud, Johnsgård, and Stormo farms in Tranøy Municipality (population: 106)
the part of Hillesøy Municipality on the island of Senja and the whole island of Hekkingen (population: 1,159) 
These areas joined to old areas of Lenvik to form a new, larger municipality of Lenvik with a total population of 10,219.

In March 2017, the Parliament of Norway voted to merge the municipalities of Berg, Torsken, Lenvik, and Tranøy.  The new municipality will encompass the whole island of Senja plus part of the mainland located between the Gisundet strait and the Malangen fjord. The new municipality was established on 1 January 2020 and it was named Senja Municipality.

Name
The municipality (originally the parish) is named after the old Lenvik farm, since the first Lenvik Church was built there. The river name is derived from the word  which means "long". From 1889 to 1908, the name was spelled .

Coat of arms
The coat of arms was granted on 22 August 1986 and it was in used until 1 January 2020 when the municipality became part of the new Senja Municipality. The official blazon is "Azure, three oars bendwise Or, blades to the chief". This means the arms have a blue field (background) and the charge is three oars laying diagonally with the blades at the top of the shield. The oars have a tincture of Or which means they are commonly colored yellow, but if it is made out of metal, then gold is used. The blue color in the field and the oars were chosen as a symbol for sailing and shipping along with the fishing industry which is the main form of income in the municipality. The arms were designed by Arvid Sveen.

Churches
The Church of Norway had one parish within the municipality of Lenvik. It was part of the Senja prosti (deanery) in the Diocese of Nord-Hålogaland.

History
The first church was built around 1150 at Bjorelvnes, and for a century, this was the northernmost church in the world.  Important villages in the past include Klauva and Gibostad.  Gibostad was the administrative centre until the 1960s, when the administration was moved to Finnsnes. In 2000, Finnsnes was declared a town.

Geography
The municipality of Lenvik lies partly on the island of Senja and also on the mainland of Norway.  The Malangen fjord flows along the northern boundary and the Solbergfjorden lies on the southern boundary.  The Gisundet strait runs north–south through the center of the municipality with only one road crossing, the Gisund Bridge.  The municipalities of Berg and Tranøy border the municipality to the west, the municipality of Tromsø is to the north (across the Malangen fjord), the municipalities of Balsfjord and Målselv are to the east, and the municipalities of Sørreisa and Dyrøy are to the south.

Climate

Government
All municipalities in Norway, including Lenvik, are responsible for primary education (through 10th grade), outpatient health services, senior citizen services, unemployment and other social services, zoning, economic development, and municipal roads.  The municipality is governed by a municipal council of elected representatives, which in turn elect a mayor.  The municipality falls under the Senja District Court and the Hålogaland Court of Appeal.

Municipal council
The municipal council  of Lenvik was made up of 31 representatives that were elected to four year terms.  The party breakdown of the final municipal council was as follows:

Media gallery

See also
List of former municipalities of Norway

References

External links

 
Senja
Former municipalities of Norway
1838 establishments in Norway
2020 disestablishments in Norway
Populated places disestablished in 2020